Don't Miss the Train is the second full-length album released by punk band No Use for a Name. It was re-released on Fat Wreck Chords on October 23, 2001 with different artwork by artist, Mark deSalvo.

Track listing
 "Born Addicted" – 2:40
 "Thorn in My Side" – 2:18
 "Looney Toon" – 1:50
 "TollBridge" – 2:39
 "Hole" – 1:56
 "Another Step" – 2:18
 "Don't Miss the Train" – 2:55
 "Watching" – 3:04
 "Punk Points" – 1:56
 "Tan in a Can" – 2:00
 "Death Doesn't Care" – 3:21
 "Get Out of This Town" – 1:55

Personnel
 Tony Sly – vocals, guitar
 Chris Dodge – guitar
 Steve Papoutsis – bass
 Rory Koff – drums

References

No Use for a Name albums
1992 albums
New Red Archives albums